A Ministry of Higher Education is a government department that focuses on the provision or regulation of institutions of higher education. In some countries these exist as ministries compounded with other responsibilities like the oversight of scientific research.

Examples
 Ministry of Higher Education (Afghanistan)
 Ministry of Higher Education and Scientific Research (Algeria)
 Ministry of Higher Education, Science and Culture (East Timor)
 Ministry of Higher Education (Egypt)
 Ministry of Higher Education, Research and Innovation, France
 Ministry of Science, Research and Technology (Iran)
 Ministry of Higher Education and Scientific Research (Iraq)
 Ministry of Higher Education and Scientific Research (Ivory Coast)
 Ministry of Higher Education and Scientific Research (Jordan)
 Ministry of Education and Higher Education (Lebanon)
 Ministère de l’Enseignement Supérieur et de la Recherche Scientifique, Madagascar
 Ministry of Higher Education (Malaysia)
 Ministry of Higher Education (Oman)
 Ministry of Science and Higher Education (Poland)
 Ministry of Science, Technology and Higher Education (Portugal)
 Ministry of Higher Education and Highways (Sri Lanka)
 Ministry of Higher Education (Soviet Union)
 Ministry of Higher Education, Science and Technology (disambiguation): Dominican Republic, Kenya, South Sudan, Tanzania, and Zimbabwe
 Ministry of Higher Education, Science, Research and Innovation (Thailand)
 Ministry of Higher Education and Scientific Research (Tunisia)
 Ministry of Higher Education and Scientific Research (UAE)
Ministry of Science and Higher Education (Ethiopia)
Ministry of Higher Education (Syria)

See also
 Ministry of Higher Education and Research
 Ministry of National Education (France)

Higher Education